In recognition of the best players in the UEFA Champions League each year, UEFA gives out several awards to the most outstanding performers of the European club football season. The awards are presented in August each year at a special gala in Monaco; previously, the ceremony would coincide with the UEFA Super Cup, but since the Super Cup was moved to early August in 2014, the UEFA awards ceremony has been combined with the UEFA Champions League group stage draw. Internazionale and Real Madrid are the only teams whose players won all of the available awards in the same season (in the 2009–10 and 2017–18 seasons, respectively).

For the 2010–11 season, the UEFA Club Footballer of the Year award was replaced by the UEFA Best Player in Europe Award, but the positional awards returned in 2016–17. Positional awards for players in the UEFA Women's Champions League were introduced in 2019–20.

Player(s) of the Year

UEFA Men's Player of the Year

UEFA Women's Player of the Year

UEFA Champions League Player of the Season

By country

By club

UEFA Women's Champions League Player of the Season

By country

By club

Best Goalkeeper
From 1998 to 2009 the Best European Goalkeeper was awarded to the same goalkeepers that won this award.

Men's award

*Bold notes a player that won the UEFA Club Footballer Of The Year/UEFA Best Player in Europe award the same year.

By country

By club

Women's award
*Bold notes a player that won the UEFA Women's Player of the Year award the same year.

By country

By club

Best Defender

Men's award

*Bold notes a player that won the UEFA Club Footballer Of The Year/UEFA Best Player in Europe award the same year.

By country

By club

Women's award
*Bold notes a player that won the UEFA Women's Player of the Year award the same year.

By country

By club

Best Midfielder

Men's award

*Bold notes a player who also won the UEFA Club Footballer of the Year/UEFA Best Player in Europe award the same year.

By country

By club

Women's award
*Bold notes a player that won the UEFA Women's Player of the Year award the same year.

By country

By club

Best Forward

Men's award

*Bold notes a player who won the UEFA Club Footballer Of The Year/UEFA Best Player in Europe award the same year.

By country

By club

Women's award
*Bold notes a player that won the UEFA Women's Player of the Year award the same year.

By country

By club

Coach(es) of the Year

European Football Coach of the Season

UEFA Men's Coach of the Year

By country

By club

UEFA Women's Coach of the Year

By country

By club

UEFA Technical Observers Best Goal of the Season
This award is chosen by UEFA Technical Observers as the best goal of the season. Cristiano Ronaldo has won this award twice, more than any other player.

UEFA Fans' Goal of the Tournament
This award is voted by the fans as the best goal of the season. Lionel Messi has won this award three times, more than any other player.

By country

By club

See also
UEFA Men's Player of the Year Award
UEFA Women's Player of the Year Award
UEFA Men's Coach of the Year Award
UEFA Women's Coach of the Year Award
UEFA Club Footballer of the Year
UEFA Team of the Year

References

External links
UEFA Club Football Awards

Club Football Awards